Choi Gwang-hyeon (born 16 April 1986 in Gangwon-do, South Korea) is a South Korean judoka who competes in the men's 60 kg category. He won gold twice in the Asian Judo Championships. At the 2012 Summer Olympics, he was defeated in the quarter finals.

References

External links
 
 

Living people
1986 births
Olympic judoka of South Korea
Judoka at the 2012 Summer Olympics
Judoka at the 2014 Asian Games
South Korean male judoka
Sportspeople from Gangwon Province, South Korea
Asian Games medalists in judo
Asian Games gold medalists for South Korea
Universiade medalists in judo
Medalists at the 2014 Asian Games
Universiade gold medalists for South Korea
21st-century South Korean people